The Will and the Way is a 1973 novel by the British writer L.P. Hartley. It was his final novel, published posthumously following his death in 1972.

References

Bibliography
  Wright, Adrian. Foreign Country: The Life of L.P. Hartley. I. B. Tauris, 2001.

1973 British novels
Novels by L. P. Hartley
Hamish Hamilton books